Sapahar is an Upazila of Naogaon District in the Division of Rajshahi, Bangladesh.

Geography

Sapahar is located at 25.1250°N 88.5819°E. It has 19,770 house holds and total area 244.49 km2.

Sapahar Upazila is bounded by Tapan CD Block in Dakshin Dinajpur district, West Bengal, India, on the north, Patnitala Upazila on the east, Porsha Upazila on the south, and Bamangola CD Block, in Malda district, West Bengal, on the west. Main river  Punarbhaba at Patari village and Jabai Beel are notable.

Town profile

Sapahar Sadar Town covers an area of 8.3 km2 (3.2 sq mi). The town area consists of ward no. 1, 2, 4 and partially 3. According to the census of 2011, It has a population of 12696. About 2924 households are situated here. Previously this place was known as a hat. In 1979, a police station was set up here. Later in 1985 it was turned into a upazila. This town is very famous for its huge improvement in education sector. Many educational institutions can be found here, including one government college and one government girls' high school. It has 9 kindergartens, 5 high schools, 4 madrashas, 3 colleges and 2 Technical institutions. Besides there are many IT institutions, clubs and recreation centers. It is also a very popular destination for shopping and other business. Many large markets and business centers are installed here. Several banking systems are also available here. All kinds of modern facilities are provided here so its population is increasing day by day.

Demographics
According to 2011 Bangladesh census, Sapahar had a population of 161,792. Males constituted 50.25% of the population and females 49.75%. Muslims formed 93.26% of the population, Hindus 4.87%, Christians 0.46% and others 1.42%. Sapahar had a literacy rate of 42.19% for the population 7 years and above.

Most of the population speak in Bengali. Bengali people formed 98.13% of the population. Other 1.87 of the population speak in some tribal language; such as Santali, Sadri, Munda, Mahali etc.

Art and culture
 Sapahar Dance Academy
 Sapahar Comedy Club

Economy
Most of the people of the Sapahar Upazila depends on the agriculture. Agriculture plays a great role on the people of sapahar upazila.
Land use:
Total cultivable land 25162 hectares, fallow land 100 hectares; single crop 62%, double crop 29% and treble crop land 9.

Main corps are paddy, wheat, fish and vegetables. Apart from these, Sapahar is widely known for Mango production and mango export.

Points of interest
 Jobay Beel

Administration
Sapahar Thana, now an upazila, was formed in 1979.

The Upazila is divided into six union parishads: Aihai, Goala, Pathari, Sapahar, Shiranti, and Tilna. The union parishads are subdivided into 151 mauzas and 232 villages.

Education

Government College 1, Non-government College 5, Government High School 1, Non-government High School 30, Government Primary School 53, Non-government Primary School 49, Community School 6, Satellite School 12, Madrasah 46, Computer Training Center 3.

The names of popular educational institutes of Sapahar include:
 Sapahar Government College
 Chowdhury Chan Mohammad Women College 
 Bhioil Degree College
 Tilna Degree College
 Dighirhat Degree College
 Sapahar Technical And Business Management College

High schools 
 Al-Helal Islami Academy & College, Sapahar, Naogaon
 Sapahar Pilot High School, Naogaon
 Sapahar Govt. Girls High School
 Zaman Nagor Girls High School
 Dangapara High School
 Shironty Moinakuri High School
 Tilna ML High School
 Jobay High School
 Aihai High School
 Tiloni-Patari High School
 Mirapara High School
 Bhioil High School
 Kalmudanga High School
 Goala High School
 Nischinta Pur High School
 Khottapara High School
 Koch Kurulia High School
 Teghoria B.L High School
 Tatoir Bakharpur High School
 Asharanda High School
 Chalkgopal High School

Primary/KG
 Al-Helal Islami Academy & College, Sapahar, Naogaon
 Sapahar Biddyaniketon (KG School)
 Sapahar Govt. Model Primary School
 Oxford Kindergarten
 Islamic International School
 Joypur Rajjyodhar Govt. Primary School, Sapahar
 Sristy Academy, Sapahar
 Nucleus Pre-Cadet Academy, Sapahar
 Tengrakuri Primary School
 Mahajidpara Govt. Primary School
 MANIKURA Govt Primary School 
 Jobay Govt. Primary School
 Tilna Govt. PrimarySchool
 Ashranda Govt. Primary School
 Aihai Govt. Primary School.
 Kherunda Govt. Primary School
 Tatoir Govt Primary School, Tatoir
 Kuchindari Govt.Primary School
 Chackgopal Govt. Primary School*

Madrashas
 Sapahar Sharaftullah Madrasha
 Sapahar Sahanabi Qaomi Madrasha
 Sapahar Mahila Madrasha
Chanchahar Fazil Madrasha
 Patari Fazil Madrasha
 Mohajid Para Dakhil Madrasa
 Baikanthapur Tiloni Dakhil Madrasha 
 Jobay Sufia Senior Fazil Madrasha
 Mungroil Fazil Madrasha
 Gopalpur Fazil Madrasha
 Aladipur Madrasha
 Islampur Dakhil Madrasha
 Tatoir Bakharpur Mohila Dhakil Madrasah
Shahabajpur M.U.Alim madrasha
Pahari Pukur Dalhil Madrasha
Malipur Manikpir Dakhil Madrasha
Hapania K.M.Fazil Madrasha

Computer Training Center
 Sapahar IT Point.
 Bondhu computer training institute.*
 Ananda Computer Institute
Sapahar vocational training institute

Gallery

References

 
Upazilas of Naogaon District